Q101 may refer to:

 Archive Series No. 2: Live in Chicago Q101, a live broadcast 'studio' album released by Violent Femmes in 2006
 CKMQ-FM, Merritt, British Columbia, Canada
 KQDJ-FM, Valley City, North Dakota
 WKQX (FM), an alternative rock station in Chicago, Illinois
 WICO-FM, Snow Hill, Maryland (former incarnation)
 WJAQ, Marianna, Florida (former incarnation)
 WJDQ, Meridian, Mississippi
 WQPO, Harrisonburg, Virginia
 Q101 Chicago
 Q101 (New York City bus)
 Q100 (New York City bus) (formerly the Q101R)
 Quran 101, the 101st chapter of the Islamic Holy book